Gradski stadion Sinj is a football stadium in Sinj, Croatia. It was built in 2006 and serves as home stadium for NK Junak Sinj football club. The stadium has a capacity of 3,096 spectators (3,075 seated).

Football venues in Croatia
NK Junak Sinj